Wildebeest chess is a chess variant created by R. Wayne Schmittberger in 1987. The Wildebeest board is 11×10 squares. Besides the standard chess pieces, each side has two camels and one "wildebeest" - a piece which may move as either a camel or a knight.

The inventor's intent was "to balance the number of 'riders'—pieces that move along open lines—with the number of 'leapers'—pieces that jump". (So for each side, two knights, two camels, and a wildebeest balance two rooks, two bishops, and a queen.)

The game was played regularly in the (now defunct) correspondence game club NOST.

Game rules

Pieces and pawns move and capture the same as they do in standard chess, except for two new pieces, and the pawn's ability to advance to the players' fifth  in a single move from either their second or third ranks. Wildebeest chess differs from the standard game in that a win can be achieved either by checkmate or  stalemate. In both cases the losing side has no legal moves.

Camel
The camel is a (1,3)-leaper fairy chess piece. It moves and captures like an elongated move of a chess knight – jumping in a 2×4 (squares) rectangular pattern over any intervening men. Each camel is thus limited to squares of one color.

Wildebeest
The wildebeest moves and captures as a camel and a chess knight.

Pawns
 A pawn has the option of advancing one, two, or three squares on its first move.
 Pawns that have advanced one square (i.e., white pawns on the third , and black pawns on the eighth rank) have the option of advancing one or two squares.
 Pawns that have advanced two or more squares (i.e., white pawns on the fourth rank or beyond, and black pawns on the seventh rank or beyond) may advance only one step at a time.
 En passant captures are possible. A pawn can be captured en passant if it has advanced two or three squares in a single move, and an enemy pawn on an adjacent file could have captured it, had it moved a lesser number of squares instead. As in chess, the option to capture en passant must be taken immediately, else the right is forfeited.
 A pawn may promote only to a queen or wildebeest.

Castling
Normal conventions apply when castling, with the only difference that the castling player can choose to slide his king one, two, three, or four squares. As in chess, the castling rook finishes on the opposite side of the king on the square adjacent.

See also
 Parallel worlds chess – another chess variant by R. Wayne Schmittberger

Notes

References

Bibliography

External links
 Wildebeest Chess by Hans Bodlaender, The Chess Variant Pages
 Recognized Chess Variant: Wildebeest Chess by Glenn Overby, The Chess Variant Pages

 Wildebeest Chess a simple program by Ed Friedlander (Java)

Chess variants
Fairy chess
1987 in chess
Board games introduced in 1987